Benazir Bhutto University may refer to:
 Shaheed Benazir Bhutto City University in Karachi, Sindh
 Shaheed Benazir Bhutto Dewan University in Karachi, Sindh
 Shaheed Benazir Bhutto University of Veterinary & Animal Sciences in Sakrand, Sindh
 Benazir Bhutto Shaheed University (Karachi) in Karachi, Sindh
 Shaheed Benazir Bhutto University (Sheringal) in Dir, Khyber Pakhtunkhwa
 Shaheed Benazir Bhutto University (Shaheed Benazirabad) in Shaheed Benazirabad, Sindh
 Shaheed Benazir Bhutto Women University in Peshawar, Khyber Pakhtunkhwa
 Shaheed Mohtarma Benazir Bhutto Medical University in Larkana, Sindh
 Mohtarma Benazir Bhutto Shaheed Medical College in Mirpur Azad Kashmir
 Shaheed Benazir Bhutto Medical College in Lyari, Karachi, Pakistan

Educational institution disambiguation pages
Universities and colleges in Pakistan
Universities and colleges in Karachi